Paul Ronald Reiffel (born 19 April 1966) is an Australian former cricketer who played in 35 Tests and 92 One Day Internationals (ODIs) from 1992 to 1999. He was part of Australia's victorious 1999 World Cup team. After retirement he became a first-class cricket umpire. He is currently a member of the Elite Panel of ICC Umpires.

Playing career
Reiffel's career best bowling figures of 6/71 came at Edgbaston in 1993. Throughout his career he took 104 wickets at 26.96 in 35 Tests, taking 5 or more wickets in an innings five times. An accurate bowler whose main attacking weapon was seam bowling, Reiffel was a more than handy batsman. While limited in his shotmaking ability, he had a solid defence. Two notable achievements in his Australian playing career were being members of the winning 1999 Cricket World Cup ODI team and the test side that defeated the West Indies during the 1994/95 Frank Worrell Trophy series. Reiffel was a Victorian cricket captain who was notorious for declaring a Victorian innings closed in 2001 with Michael Klinger on 99 not out.

Umpiring career
Reiffel made his first class umpiring debut in the 2004/2005 season after first umpiring in Melbourne grade cricket in 2002. Reiffel joined the Cricket Australia National Umpire's Panel in the 2005/2006 season. In 2008, he became a member of the International Cricket Council International Panel of ICC Umpires, the first former Australian Test cricketer to do so. He made his international on-field umpiring debut in a One Day International match between Australia and New Zealand on 6 February 2009. He also umpired in both Tests of the West Indies-New Zealand Test Series in July–August 2012.

In June 2013, Reiffel was elevated to the Elite Panel of ICC Umpires. He was selected as one of the twenty umpires to stand in matches during the 2015 Cricket World Cup.

On the first day of the fourth Test between India and England at the Wankhede Stadium in Mumbai, Reiffel was hit on the head by a throw from fielder Bhuvneshwar Kumar. He left the field and underwent some precautionary tests, which showed that he had not suffered any major injuries. The International Cricket Council, however, decided against Reiffel taking any further part in the match. He was replaced by Marais Erasmus who was originally the third umpire.

In April 2019, he was named as one of the sixteen umpires to stand in matches during the 2019 Cricket World Cup.

Family
Reiffel's father, Ron Reiffel, played for the Richmond Football Club. His grandfather, Lou Reiffel, was also an Australian rules footballer and played for both Melbourne and South Melbourne.

Following the death of his father in December 2018, Reiffel pulled out of officiating during Sri Lanka's tour of New Zealand the following month.

See also
 List of Test cricket umpires
 List of One Day International cricket umpires
 List of Twenty20 International cricket umpires

References

1966 births
Living people
Australia One Day International cricketers
Australia Test cricketers
Australian cricket umpires
Australian cricketers
Australian One Day International cricket umpires
Australian Test cricket umpires
Australian Twenty20 International cricket umpires
Cricketers at the 1996 Cricket World Cup
Cricketers at the 1999 Cricket World Cup
Cricketers from Melbourne
Nottinghamshire cricketers
Richmond cricketers
Victoria cricketers
People from Box Hill, Victoria